Ouwehand is a Dutch surname. It translates to "old hand", but is thought to derive from Ouwehan ("Han Sr."), akin to Ouwejans ("John Sr.") and Jongejans ("John Jr."), or have been a misreading of Ouweland ("old land"). People with the surname include:

 Cornelis Ouwehand, (1920–1996), Dutch anthropologist
 Cornelis Willem "Cor" Ouwehand (1892–1951), Dutch entrepreneur and  founder of the 
 Ouwehands Dierenpark, a zoo in Rhenen.
 Esther Ouwehand, (born 1976), Dutch politician
 Willem H. Ouwehand, (born 1953), Dutch hematologist

References

Dutch-language surnames